William Steiger (born c. 1933) was an American football player.  He grew up in Olympia, Washington, and attended Washington State University.  He played college football at the end position in 1955, 1956, and 1958 for the Washington State Cougars football team.  As a junior in 1956, he was the second leading receiver in the country in 1956 with 39 catches for 609 yards. He was selected by the Football Writers Association of America as a first-team player on its 1956 College Football All-America Team, and received second-team honors from the Associated Press.  In June 1957, he paralyzed in an accident when he dove into a swimming pool in Walnut Creek, California. He underwent surgery and regained his mobility.  He missed the 1957 football season but returned to play for Washington State in 1958.

References

American football ends
Washington State Cougars football players
Players of American football from Washington (state)
Sportspeople from Olympia, Washington